Tez was a mobile payments service by Google, targeted at users in India, later folded into the new Google Pay app on 28 August 2018. It operated atop the Unified Payments Interface, developed by the National Payments Corporation of India.

Tez worked on the vast majority of India's smartphones (with apps for both Android and iOS) with the Android app supporting English, Hindi, Tamil, Bengali, Gujarati, Kannada, Marathi, and Telugu. There were plans to release the app in other emerging countries including Vietnam, Indonesia, and Thailand. "Tez" is the Hindi word for "Fast". Within 37 days after being launched, Tez got about 8.5 million installations. Over 30 million transactions were made on the app as of 27 October 2017.

Service

Acceptability
Tez was accepted by PVR Cinemas, redBus, McDonald's, ACT Broadband, State government Electricity boards and was expected to be joined by a number of other businesses like Dish TV, Jet Airways and Domino's, Vodafone Idea, Swiggy, Zomato, Uber, Ola, Clubfactory, Zappfresh, Amazon, Flipkart and many more businesses. Google was also working with existing advertisers and online e-commerce platforms like Shopify and payment aggregators like BillDesk and PayU. Google planned to add even more ways to pay on Tez (e.g., credit cards and wallets). Select phones from manufacturer partners Lava, Nokia Mobile, and Panasonic would have come with Tez preinstalled.

Device compatibility
The app was compatible with the vast majority of Android and iOS devices.

Technology
The application does not require users to share any personal information such as mobile numbers or usernames like other payment applications. Instead, it uses audio QR codes that rely on sound transmitted at a frequency inaudible to the human ear from the payee handset to the merchant handset. This technology does away with the need for NFC chips on the handsets, giving it an advantage because a significant number of smartphones in India and other developing markets do not have NFC chips embedded.

References 

Discontinued Google services
Payment and settlement systems in India
Android (operating system) software
Mobile payments